One Devonshire Place is a modern skyscraper in the Government Center neighborhood of Boston, Massachusetts directly across from One Boston Place.

The building is mixed-use, with 8 floors of offices and 35 of residential space (including a basement level). The building is built on two levels, with the Washington Street side a full story higher than the Devonshire side. There is an open driveway passing through the bottom level between these streets, a rarity for a skyscraper.

Education
The towers are zoned to Boston Public Schools.

For elementary and middle school, students may apply to:
 Any school within the location's "assignment zone"
In this case, the North Zone 
 Any school within the location's "walk zone," regardless of the school's "assignment zone."
Eligible "walk zone" schools not citywide and not within the North Zone: None known
 Any citywide elementary school, middle school, and K-8

All high schools are considered "citywide".

See also
 List of tallest buildings in Boston

References

External links
 Homepage

Skyscraper office buildings in Boston
Buildings and structures completed in 1983
Residential skyscrapers in Boston